Enhydris is a genus of slightly venomous, rear-fanged, snakes in the family Homalopsidae. The genus is endemic to the tropical area of Indo-Australian region.

Species
The following 6 species are recognized:

 Enhydris chanardi Murphy & Voris, 2005
 Enhydris enhydris (Schneider, 1799)
 Enhydris innominata (Morice, 1875)
 Enhydris jagorii (W. Peters, 1863)
 Enhydris longicauda (Bourret, 1934)
 Enhydris subtaeniata (Bourret, 1934)

Several additional species have traditionally been placed here, but are now often in genera such as Subsessor and Pseudoferania. Another species, Enhydris smithi , was considered to be a valid species by herpetologists M.A. Smith 1943, Das 2010, and Wallach et al. 2014, but was considered to be a synonym of Enhydris jagorii by Cox et al. 1998, and Murphy & Voris 2014.

Nota bene: In the list above,  a binomial authority in parentheses indicates that the species was originally described in a genus other than Enhydris.

Etymology
The specific names, jagorii and smithi, are in honor of German naturalist Fedor Jagor and British herpetologist Malcolm Arthur Smith, respectively.

References

Further reading
 Sonnini CS, Latreille PA (1802). Histoire Naturelle des Reptiles, avec figures dessinées d'après nature. Tome IV. Seconde Partie. Serpens. Paris: Deterville. (Crapelet, printer). 410 pp. (Enhydris, new genus, pp. 200–201).

 
Colubrids
Snake genera
Taxa named by Pierre André Latreille
Taxa named by Charles-Nicolas-Sigisbert Sonnini de Manoncourt